Jay C. Hoffman (born November 6, 1961) is a Democratic member of the Illinois House of Representatives, representing the 113th district. He previously served from 1991 to 2011, with a nine-month interruption in 1997.

Early life
Jay was born and raised in Highland, Illinois. After high school, Jay received his Bachelor of Science in Finance from Illinois State University, where he was a four-year starter on the Illinois State Redbirds baseball team. He later graduated from Saint Louis University School of Law and began his career in public service as a prosecutor in St. Clair County.

Legislative career
Jay C. Hoffman was elected to his first term as an Illinois State Representative in November 1990. After just four years in the Illinois General Assembly, Jay was promoted to floor leader for the House Democrats and later became Chairman of the House Transportation and Motor Vehicles Committee, where he served for five terms. Jay also served on the committees of Judicial I (Civil Law), Judicial II (Criminal Law), Labor, Consumer Affairs, Railroad Safety, appropriations committees, and several other committees and task forces. He helped pass the state's first capital construction plan in more than a decade, which spent hundreds of millions of dollars for new buildings at Illinois State University, University of Illinois, and Southern Illinois University Edwardsville.

Awards and honors
Jay received for his work in the Illinois General Assembly include the Illinois Hospital Association's Legislator of the Year award, Outstanding Legislator from the Illinois State's Attorney's Association (two years), Illinois Public Transportation Association Legislator of the Year, RCGA Lewis and Clark Statesman Award (six years), St. Louis Children's Hospital State Advocate of the Year Award, Award for Outstanding Contributions to the Veterans of Illinois, the Appreciation of Dedication to Children of Illinois from the IEA, Cardinal Glennon's Crystal Wagon Award, IEA-NEA Region 45 Political Excellence Award, Southwestern Illinois Development Authority's Outstanding Individual of the Year, and the Associated Fire Fighters' Legislator of the Year Award.

Hope From the Heartland
Jay has authored a book that provides a blueprint for utilizing the state's natural resources to create jobs and reduce dependence on foreign oil.  "Hope from the Heartland: Jobs, Clean Air, Energy Security" outlines his plan on how the Midwest can lead the nation in research and the production of alternative energy by utilizing the Midwestern states' natural resources to create jobs in the declining manufacturing sector.

Connection to Blagojevich
Jay Hoffman has been closely linked to disgraced former Governor Rod Blagojevich throughout his legislative career. The Madison County Record referred to Rep. Hoffman as "right-hand man and loyal ally" to Rod Blagojevich in 2007. The St Louis Post Dispatch has referred to him as "Gov. Rod Blagojevich's top legislative ally" and the Belleville News-Democrat has called Mr. Hoffman "one of Gov. Rod Blagojevich's staunchest political allies and closest friends". In early 2009 Jay voted in favor of the impeachment of the former Governor.

References

External links
Representative Jay C. Hoffman (D) 112th District at the Illinois General Assembly
By session: 98th, 96th, 95th, 94th, 93rd
State Representative Jay Hoffman constituency site
 
Jay C. Hoffman at Illinois House Democrats

 http://www.illelections.com/elections/southern/article_b097271f-25a5-5c30-af9a-7ab7ade6fc96.html
 https://archive.today/20130415215437/http://www.stlrcga.org/documents/rcgadvocate/Aug26.html
 https://web.archive.org/web/20120514120509/http://cast.illinoisstate.edu/events/2010ScienceandTechnologyWeek.shtml
 https://web.archive.org/web/20100708022254/http://www.stlrcga.org/documents/rcgadvocate/Dec16-09.html
 HighBeam

Democratic Party members of the Illinois House of Representatives
1961 births
Living people
People from Highland, Illinois
Illinois State Redbirds baseball players
Saint Louis University School of Law alumni
21st-century American politicians
People from St. Clair County, Illinois